Rhus taitensis is a small tree or shrub in the sumac family of plants. It is found from tropical Asia, to Australia and many islands of the Pacific ocean. The chemical tetrahydroxysqualene from dried and ground parts of R. taitensis has in vitro activity against Mycobacterium tuberculosis and the plant has been used in folk medicine locally to treat diarrhea and hearing loss.

Distribution
The native range of R. taitensis includes Asian countries, such as Indonesia (in the Sulawesi, Irian Jaya, eastern Java, the Lesser Sunda Islands, and the Moluccas), Malaysia, Papua New Guinea, and the Philippines; western and south central Pacific island locales, such as the Society Islands of French Polynesia (the type specimens were collected from the island of Tahiti by Carlo Luigi Giuseppe Bertero and J. A. Moerenhout during an expedition described in Moerenhout's book entitled Voyages aux îles du Grand Océan), Niue, Palau and others within Micronesia, and the Solomon Islands; and Australia (in northeastern Queensland).

References

taitensis
Plants described in 1837
Flora of Australia
Flora of French Polynesia
Flora of Malesia
Flora of Niue
Flora of Palau
Flora of Papuasia
Medicinal plants